"Stranger by the Minute" is a single by British progressive rock band Porcupine Tree, released in October 1999, from the Stupid Dream album. It came in two formats: a regular CD and a 7" vinyl (limited to 1.000 copies) which features "Hallogallo", a Neu! cover. It was originally intended to include the complete version of "Even Less" on the single, but this would have meant exceeding the maximum running time allowed for a single in the UK. The CD, besides the video for "Piano Lessons", contains a Macromedia presentation including band photos, lyrics, the band's discography, and more.

Track listing (CD)
"Stranger by the Minute (Edit)" – 3:47
"Even Less (Part 2)" – 7:26
"VIDEO: Piano Lessons" – 3:30

Track listing (7" vinyl)
A/ "Stranger by the Minute (Edit)" 3:45
B/ "Hallogallo" 4:04

All titles by Steven Wilson, except "Hallogallo" by Rother/Dinger (Neu!).
"Hallogallo" was originally recorded in 1995 and issued on the Insignificance cassette. This version has been remixed and slightly extended.

Personnel
Steven Wilson – vocals, guitars, piano, samples, bass on "Stranger by the Minute", all instruments on "Hallogallo"
Richard Barbieri – analogue synthesizers, hammond organ, mellotron
Colin Edwin – bass on "Even Less (Part 2)"
Chris Maitland – drums, percussion, backing vocals on "Stranger by the Minute"
Theo Travis – flute on "Even Less (Part 2)"

External links
The complete Steven Wilson discography

1999 singles
1998 songs
Porcupine Tree songs
Songs written by Steven Wilson